Balvir Singh Luthra is an Indian politician and farmer who represents Raisinghnagar constituency in the Rajasthan Legislative Assembly. He is a member of the Bharatiya Janata Party. Luthra was born in Sri Ganganagar in 1962. In 1984, he graduated from the University of Rajasthan.

References

Bharatiya Janata Party politicians from Rajasthan
1962 births
Living people

University of Rajasthan alumni